Štefan Chrtianský may refer to:

 Štefan Chrtianský (born 1962), Czechoslovak volleyball player
 Štefan Chrtianský (born 1989), Slovak volleyball player